Al-Ḥijr is the 15th Quranic chapter (sūrah). It has 99 verses (āyāt).

Regarding the timing and contextual background of the revelation (asbāb al-nuzūl), it is an earlier Meccan surah, believed to have been received by the Islamic prophet Muhammad shortly after chapter 12, Yusuf, during his last year in Mecca. Like other surahs of this period, it praises God. Parts of Q15:4-74 are preserved in the Ṣan‘ā’1 lower text.

Summary
1-3  Unbelievers  will one day wish themselves Muslims
4-5  Every nation has its day of grace
6  Muhammad charged with demoniacal possession by the disbelievers (the Quraish)
7 The unbelievers say a true prophet would have come with a company of angels
8  Angels are not sent to gratify curiosity, but to minister judgment
9  God the author and preserver of the Quran
10-11  The former prophets were laughed to scorn 	
12-15  The scoffing Quraish judicially blinded 	
16-20  God declares his glory in the heaven and the earth 	
21-22  He is active in every part of Nature 	
23-25  He is the God of life, death, and judgment 	
26-29  God says Men created of clay—the Jinn of fire
29-33  Iblís among the angels refuses to worship Adam 	
34-38  He is cursed and respited until the judgment 	
39-40  Satan declares to God his purpose to seduce men 	
41-42  The elect are safe from Satan’s power 	
43-44  The seven gates of hell will receive Satan’s followers 	
45-50  Paradise joys in store for true believers 	
51-77 The story of Abraham and Lot 	
78-79  The unbelieving Midianites are destroyed 	
80-81  The scoffing inhabitants of Al Hajr reject their prophets though accompanied with miracles 	
82-84  Rock-hewn houses fail to save them 	
85-86 The heaven and earth created in righteousness
 87  Command to repeat the seven verses (Al-Fatiha)
88-90 Muhammad not to envy the prosperity of infidels
91-93  The enemies of God will surely be punished
94-96 Muhammad commanded to preach boldly
97-99  He is exhorted to praise and serve God until death

Name 
This Surah takes its name from 80th ayat  which refers to Mada'in Saleh, a pre-Islamic archaeological site, occasionally called Al-Hijr, or Hegra.

Time of Revelation 
The revelation of this surah occurred at a similar time to that of Surah Ibrahim.   Its also repeats the admonitions.  Muhammad had been spreading the message for a long time.  His kin had become increasingly stiff-necked and obstinate in their hostility, hatred and mocking. Muhammad had started to feel tired in his attempts against disbelief and restrictions of his people. Allah reassured him again.

Central Theme 
This surah contains brief mentions of Tawhid, and provides an admonition to the disbelievers.  The primary subjects of the surah are:

 cautioning the individuals who dismissed the message and 
 providing solace and support to Muhammad,

The Quran never limits itself to mere rebuke; reproach and reprimand.  It depends on its statute.  The surah contains brief contentions for Tawhid and admonition in the tale of Adam and Satan.

Exegesis

15:9 Preservation of the Quran

Ibn Kathir says, "God, may He be exalted, stated that He is the One Who revealed the Dhikr to him, which is the Qur'an, and He is protecting it from being changed or altered".

Notes

References 

 Abdullah, A. (2011). Role of context and objectives of the Surah in shaping the episodes of the Qurʼanic narrative: the narrative of Lot as an example. American Journal of Islamic Social Sciences, 28(4), 31–64.
 Boullata, I. J. (2000). Literary structures of religious meaning in the Qurʼān. London: Curzon Pr.
 Haggar, D. A.Repetition: A key to qur'anic style, structure and meaning. (Order No. AAI3447474, Dissertation Abstracts International, A: The Humanities and Social Sciences, 1661.
 Neuwirth, A. (2000). Referentiality and textuality in Sūrat al-Hijr: Some observations on the Qur'anic "canonical process" and the emergence of a community. (pp. 143–172). Curzon.
 Ohlander, E. S. (2010). Qur'anic studies. (pp. 81–93). De Gruyter.

External links 
Quran 15 Clear Quran translation
Q15:87, 50+ translations, islamawakened.com

Hijr